Simon Raiwalui (born 8 September 1974) is a Fijian former rugby union player. He served as the General Manager for his former French club, Racing Métro 92. He currently co-manages Stade Français. He has represented Fiji on a number of occasions. He has also been included in the Pacific Islanders (combined Samoa, Tonga and Fiji) touring team for Europe in November 2006. His usual position is at lock.

Early life
Raiwalui was born in Auckland, New Zealand, but was educated in Australia, where along with playing school rugby, played for club side Manly, from Colts level through to the under-21 side. He was also selected to represent the Australian Schoolboys, alongside other footballers such as Ben Tune and Joe Roff.

Rugby career
In 1997 he left Australia to play rugby in England. He joined the Sale Sharks, and later moved to Wales to play for Newport. He joined the Saracens in 2003 and made his debut for the club in September of that year against the Newcastle Falcons.

He qualifies for Fiji through his parents. He debuted for Fiji against the New Zealand All Blacks. While with Newport, he was selected for the Fijian 1999 Rugby World Cup squad. He was a key member in the side which lost to England in the quarterfinal playoffs. He retired from international rugby prior to the 2003 Rugby World Cup in Australia, though he came out of retirement for Fiji in the Pacific Nations Cup in 2006, and was then selected in the combined Pacific Nations squad.

References

External links
 Simon Raiwalui on Saracens.com
 Simon Raiwalui on teivovo.com
 Pacific Islanders profile

1974 births
Living people
Rugby union locks
Fijian rugby union players
Newport RFC players
Racing 92 players
Sale Sharks players
Saracens F.C. players
Fiji international rugby union players
Pacific Islanders rugby union players
New Zealand people of I-Taukei Fijian descent
Fijian expatriate rugby union players
Expatriate rugby union players in England
Expatriate rugby union players in France
Fijian expatriate sportspeople in Wales
Fijian expatriate sportspeople in France
Australian expatriate rugby union players
New Zealand expatriate sportspeople in France
New Zealand rugby union players
New Zealand expatriate rugby union players
Rugby union players from Auckland
Australian rugby union players
New Zealand expatriate sportspeople in Wales
Australian expatriate sportspeople in Wales
Australian expatriate sportspeople in France
Fijian expatriate sportspeople in England
Australian expatriate sportspeople in England
expatriate sportspeople in England
New Zealand emigrants to Australia
New Zealand people of Fijian descent
Australian people of Fijian descent